Two Girls in the Snow is an 1894 oil on canvas painting by the Dutch artist Isaac Israëls. It was bought from the artist in 1904 for the private Drake-Fraser collection in London, which lent it to the Rijksmuseum in Amsterdam in 1917. It was bought by the museum in 1944.

References
Zoeken
Twee meisjes in de sneeuw - Het Geheugen

1894 paintings
Paintings by Isaac Israëls
Paintings in the collection of the Rijksmuseum
Portraits of women